Bruce William Miller III (born August 6, 1987) is a former American football fullback. Miller played college football as a defensive end for the UCF Knights, finishing as the school's career leader in sacks with 35.5. He was drafted by the San Francisco 49ers in the seventh round of the 2011 NFL Draft and played for them until 2016, when he was released following an arrest for felony assault charges. He spent the next four years out of football before playing the 2020 season with the Jacksonville Jaguars.

College career
He played college football at UCF, redshirting his first year and winning All-Conference honors for four years. In college, he played defensive end.  He was named CUSA Defensive Player of the Year in his junior and senior seasons.

Professional career

San Francisco 49ers
Miller scored his first NFL touchdown on a 30-yard pass from quarterback Alex Smith on November 6, 2011 in a game against the Washington Redskins. At the end of the 2012 season, Miller and the 49ers appeared in Super Bowl XLVII. He contributed on offense and special teams as the 49ers fell to the Baltimore Ravens by a score of 34–31. On March 20, 2014, Miller signed a three-year contract extension with the 49ers. 

During the 2016 offseason, Miller attempted to switch positions from fullback to tight end. On September 5, 2016, he was arrested by the San Francisco Police Department and charged with assault for allegedly attacking two men, a 70-year-old father and his middle aged son, vacationing at the Fisherman's Wharf location of the Marriott Hotel in San Francisco. Miller was immediately released from his contract with the 49ers the same day and was charged with seven felonies, including assault with a deadly weapon. The charges were dropped.

Jacksonville Jaguars
On August 18, 2020, Miller signed with the Jacksonville Jaguars after spending the previous four years out of football. He was released on October 30, 2020, and re-signed to the practice squad on November 2. On the same day, he was suspended by the NFL for six games for violating the league's policy on performance-enhancing drugs. He was reinstated from suspension on December 14 and restored to the practice squad. He was elevated to the active roster on December 26 for the team's week 16 game against the Chicago Bears, and reverted to the practice squad after the game. His contract with the team expired after the season.

References

External links

UCF Knights bio

1987 births
Living people
People from Canton, Georgia
People from Woodstock, Georgia
Sportspeople from the Atlanta metropolitan area
Players of American football from Georgia (U.S. state)
American football defensive ends
American football fullbacks
UCF Knights football players
San Francisco 49ers players
Jacksonville Jaguars players